Monde Sondaba is a South African politician and former public servant who has represented the African National Congress (ANC) in the Eastern Cape Provincial Legislature since 2019. He was elected to the legislature in the 2019 general election, ranked 43rd on the ANC's provincial party list; he also stood for election in 2014, but on that occasion was ranked 53rd on the party list and did not secure a seat. 

Sondaba was formerly the municipal manager at Mhlontlo Local Municipality and at Mnquma Local Municipality. He also served as acting municipal manager at Ngqushwa Local Municipality in 2012.

References

External links 

 

African National Congress politicians
Living people
Year of birth missing (living people)
Members of the Eastern Cape Provincial Legislature
21st-century South African politicians